is a Japanese television and film director.

Filmography
Tokyo Love Story (1991, TV series)
Under One Roof (1993, TV series)
Platonic Sex (2001) – as producer and director
Backdancers! (2006)
Tokyo Friends: The Movie (2006)
Sherlock: Untold Stories (2019, TV series)

References

1956 births
Japanese film directors
Living people
People from Tokyo